Michael Kulich (c. December 24, 1986 – September 24, 2016) was the founder and chairman of the adult entertainment company Monarchy Distribution.

Early life 

Michael Kulich was born to parents of Russian-Jewish descent and raised in Westport, Connecticut. He graduated from Staples High School in 2004. Kulich was suspended in high school for selling Playboy magazines out of the trunk of his car.

Monarchy Distribution
Monarchy Distribution launched their first studio "Assence Films" in February, 2012 in a partnership with Exile Distribution. Assence's first title "Anal Artists" starring Sasha Grey gained notoriety for the studio brand when Kulich offered a portion of the proceeds to the National Education Association and the donation was rejected.

In March 2012, Monarchy launched 'OGEE Studios' on the heels of the success of Assence Films.

In April 2012, Monarchy announced that they had signed a deal with Blue Coyote Pictures to handle the distribution for a new Transsexual line called Tranny Factory.

In August 2012, Kulich gained notoriety when he offered a pornographic role to Valeria Lukyanova, the Ukrainian model noted for her resemblance to a Barbie doll. Lukyanova never responded to the $10,000 offer.

Following the Go Daddy commercial for Super Bowl XLVII starring Bar Refaeli and Jesse Heiman, Kulich made an offer to Heiman to appear in a pornographic film. Heiman refused, stating he would hold out for Playgirl.

In February 2012, Earlie Johnson of Muskegon, Michigan's house was burglarized and his $7,500 porn collection was stolen. Kulich stepped up to replace the collection.

In July, 2013 after TheDirty.com broke a story that Anthony Weiner had been caught sexting and involved in sexual misconduct, Kulich announced that he was producing a movie entitled "Don't Pull Out" in which 15% of the proceeds would be donated to Weiner's campaign.

In 2013 as part of the "Taboo Talks" series presented by the San Diego Center for Jewish Culture at the Lawrence Family Jewish Community Center in San Diego, Mike Kulich said:Jews in the adult industry, there’s a lot of them….The adult industry was pretty much founded by the Jews. Basically, in the early nineteen hundreds, the German Jewish immigrants came in, and when they were trying to get into different industries, there was a lot of antisemitism where they couldn’t get into normalized work….so they gravitated toward the porn industry because it’s kind of the seedier cousin of the Hollywood industry which had already been controlled by the Jews. Basically, they pretty much took it over. If you look at the big stars…

So basically back in the 1960s, 70s, it was founded by people like Dan [unintelligle], and then later in the 80s, The Godfather of the modern day porn industry, his name is Reuben Sturman, who was actually an Orthodox Jew who owned over 200 bookstores all around the country. He’s actually my godfather, which is kind of weird. So Reuben Sturman, what the Jews did pretty much was they revolutionized the adult industry and made it their own. So there was no space for antisemitism. And they basically controlled everything.In January 2014, Kulich announced the launch of Skweez Media, a new V.O.D. site catering to Adult Entertainment.

In February 2014, a film titled The Real Housewives of Westport was released. It is based on Kulich's hometown: Westport, Connecticut.

In February 2014, Kulich announced that he had launched Stunner PR, a full-service publicity firm catering to pornographic companies and performers.

Death 

On September 24, 2016, Kulich was found dead at his home in Los Angeles. Mike is survived by the love of his life Michelle Burr and their young son Tyler Kulich, who just one month before his death had finished a 3+ year battle with  Acute Lymphoblastic Leukemia.

Awards

|-
| 2012
| Asses For The Masses
| Nightmoves Best All Sex/Gonzo
| 
|-
| 2012
| Superstars
| Nightmoves Best All Sex/Gonzo
| 
|-
| 2012
| Tranny Hookups
| Nightmoves Best Transsexual Release
| 
|-
| 2013
| Assence Films
| AVN Award Best New Studio
| 
|-
| 2013
| Chocolate Yam Yams 
| AVN Award Clever Title Of The Year
| 
|-
| 2013
| Kelly Shibari is Overloaded 
| AVN Award Specialty Release of the Year
| 
|-
| 2013
| Kelly Shibari is Overloaded 
| AVN Award Overall Marketing Campaign, Individual Project
| 
|-
| 2013
| Tranny Hookups
| AVN Award Best Transsexual Release
| 
|-
| 2013
| Kelly Shibari is Overloaded
| XBIZ Award Specialty Release of the Year
| 
|-
| 2013
| Juicy Booty
| XBIZ Award Best All Black Release
| 
|-
| 2013
| Assence Films
| XBIZ Award Best New Studio
| 
|-
| 2013
| Fuck-Book Diaries
| XBIZ Award Best Amateur Release
| 
|-
| 2013
| Black Storm Pictures
| BBW Fanfest Award Studio Of The Year
| 
|-
| 2013
| Big Mamas House
| BBW Fanfest Award DVD Release Of The Year
| 
|-
| 2013
| Kelly Shibari Is Overloaded
| Feminist Porn Award Movie Of The Year
| 
|-
| 2013
| Kelly Shibari Is Overloaded
| Nightmoves BBW Movie Of The Year
| 
|-
| 2013
| OGEE Studios
| Nightmoves Studio Of The Year
| 
|-
| 2013
| Cougar Claws
| Nightmoves MILF/Cougar Release Of The Year
| 
|-
| 2013
| Pure MILFS 3
| Nightmoves MILF/Cougar Release Of The Year
| 
|-
| 2014
| Tranny Hookups #4
| Tranny Awards Best DVD
| 
|-
| 2014
| Monarchy Distribution
| XBIZ Awards Best Marketing Campaign
| 
|-
| 2014
| Fuck-Book Diaries #6
| XBIZ Awards Pro-Am Release of the Year 
| 
|-
| 2014
| Samuari Girls #2
| XBIZ Awards Asian-Themed Release of the Year 
| 
|-
| 2014
| Kelly Shibari's Chubby Safari
| XBIZ Awards Fetish Release of the Year 
| 
|-
| 2014
| Real Couples
| AVN Award Best Amateur Series
| 
|-
| 2014
| Monarchy Distribution
| AVN Award Best Marketing Campaign – Company Image
| 
|-
| 2014
| Don't Pull Out
| AVN Award Best Marketing Campaign – Individual Project
| 
|-
| 2014
| Gonzo Nation
| AVN Award Best New Line
| 
|-
| 2014
| Latin Love Pictures
| AVN Award Best New Line
| 
|-
| 2014
| Renegade
| AVN Award Best New Line
| 
|-
| 2014
| Urban Street Studios
| AVN Award Best New Line
| 
|-
| 2014
| Big Booty Pictures
| AVN Award Best New Line
| 
|-
| 2014
| Cray Cray Vajayjay
| AVN Award Clever Title Of The Year
| 

|-
| 2014
| Tranny Hookups
| AVN Award Best Transsexual Series
| 
|}

References

1986 births
2016 deaths
People from Westport, Connecticut
American pornographic film directors
American pornographic film producers
American Jews
Male actors from Connecticut
Film directors from Connecticut
Staples High School alumni